Ernest A. Strong was a member of the Wisconsin State Assembly during the 1903 session. Strong represented Ashland County, Wisconsin. He was a Republican.

References

External links
The Political Graveyard

People from Ashland County, Wisconsin
Republican Party members of the Wisconsin State Assembly
Year of birth missing
Year of death missing